Kristin Steinert (born 3 September 1987) is a German bobsledder who has competed since 2009. Her best World Cup finish was third in the two-woman events at Lake Placid in December 2010.

She won silver at the 2011 FIBT World Championships in Königssee  in the mixed team event.

References

1987 births
Living people
German female bobsledders
21st-century German women